Jump Ultimate Stars is a fighting video game developed by Ganbarion and published by Nintendo for the Nintendo DS. It is the sequel to Jump Super Stars. The game was released in Japan on November 23, 2006.

The game keeps many features from its predecessor, and adds many more. The game boasts 305 characters (56 of which are fully playable) from 41 different Shōnen manga series.

Gameplay 
The bulk of the gameplay is based around using manga panels that represent characters to create decks on a four by five grid. Panels come in various shapes and sizes, taking up one to eight blocks. There are three kinds of panels that can be initialized in battle: Battle, Support, and Help panels, with decks needing at least one of each type and an assigned leader before being playable. Battle panels are four to eight block panels that represent playable characters. They are based on various manga panels and are used to represent what kind of special attacks the characters have. Support panels are two or three block panels that represent non-playable characters that can perform actions such as attacks, healing or status effects. Help panels are one block panels that can give different boosts to characters they are placed next to. Each battle panel comes with a certain nature. These natures (Knowledge, Strength, and Laughter) act in a Rock, Paper, Scissors relationship with Strength beating Knowledge, Knowledge beating Laughter, and Laughter beating Strength. The stronger type will deal more damage to the weaker type. New panels can be unlocked by clearing challenges in Story Mode, or evolving existing panels using gems collected in Story Mode to unlock new paths and panels, such as stronger variations of Battle panels.

Battle 
Battles commence in arenas made to look like the page of a manga. Each arena has a unique background, obstacles based on the different manga series, and contain a variety of different platforms. Many are static while others will move, break, or disappear and reappear randomly. Certain walls and floors are also destructible. During battles, players use their Battle komas to attack opponents, defeating them once they have taken enough damage or have knocked them off the stage.

New features 
Jump Ultimate Stars has been changed slightly from the gameplay of Jump Super Stars. Jump Ultimate Stars gives battle characters the ability to dash and to do a new attack while guarding, which, instead of breaking the guard of the opponent, forces them to change characters, and can be identified by a green glow coming out of the characters which executes it. Also, certain seven and eight panel koma (along with certain five and six panel koma) obtain a visual difference during battle as opposed to the appearance of the one to six koma of the very same character; some of these variations also bring a totally different set of attacks to the character (e.g. Luffy becomes Luffy (Gear 2nd) for his Level 7 & 8 koma, Naruto Uzumaki becomes Kyubii Naruto for his Level 7 & 8 koma, and Ichigo becomes Bankai Ichigo for his Level 7 & 8 level koma). Battle characters now have a new ability known as Ultimate Actions (UA). These UA are different for each character, as some recover health, other recover SP, while others can be used to dodge enemy attacks. Another new feature added is the Evolution Chart. This area allows players to upgrade their characters by spending gems (currency earned for KO'ing opponents) to buy a new koma. Each character has a chart, starting from the one block help koma and branching off into the two and three block Support and the four to eight block Battle koma. Some characters have alternate block paths which unlock a different type for that character (e.g. Goku as a Laughter type instead of a Power type), while others can be used to unlock koma for characters from the same series, quizzes for the series, and new worlds in the Story Mode.

Represented series and characters 
This is a list of represented series in Jump Ultimate Stars. Most of the main characters from each series appear as characters within the game. Note that almost all of the Battle characters are also Support and Help characters. This is also true for Support characters being Help characters. However, the exceptions are Sasuke Uchiha, Raoh, Frieza, Majin Buu and Heihachi Edajima; these characters do not have a Support character koma, but they do have their Help koma alternative. The asterisk marks newly included series. There are 24 returning series with the addition of 17 new ones, concluding 41 in total.
 Black Cat
 5 characters (2 Battle, 1 Support, 2 Help)
 Battle characters: Eve and Train Heartnet
 Bleach
 17 characters (4 Battle, 7 Support, 6 Help)
 Battle characters: Ichigo Kurosaki, Rukia Kuchiki, Tōshirō Hitsugaya and Renji Abarai
 Ichigo Kurosaki evolves into Bankai Ichigo (Lv7) and Bankai Ichigo with Hollow Mask (Lv8)
 Bobobo-bo Bo-bobo
 12 characters (2 Battle, 4 Support, 6 Help)
 Battle characters: Bobobo-bo Bo-bobo and Don Patch
 Buso Renkin
 4 characters (1 Battle, 0 Support, 3 Help)
 Battle character: Kazuki Muto
 Captain Tsubasa*
 5 characters (0 Battle, 3 Support, 2 Help)
 Cobra*
 3 characters (all Support)
 D.Gray-man 9 characters (2 Battle, 3 Support, 4 Help)
 Battle characters: Allen Walker and Lenalee Lee
 Death Note 5 characters (all Support)
 Light Yagami and Ryuk count as a single character.
 Dr. Slump 7 characters (2 Battle, 2 Support, 3 Help)
 Battle characters: Arale Norimaki and Dr. Mashirito
 Dragon Ball 13 characters (7 Battle, 2 Support, 4 Help)
 Battle characters: Son Goku, Vegeta, Son Gohan (Super Saiyan form), Gotenks, Piccolo, Freeza and Majin Buu
 Goku evolves into Super Saiyan Goku (Lv6), Super Saiyan 2 Goku (Super Saiyan 3 in his Kamehameha state) (Lv7) and Super Saiyan Vegetto (Lv8)
 Vegeta evolves into Super Saiyan Vegeta (Lv5) and Super Saiyan 2 Vegeta (Lv6)
 Gohan evolves into Super Saiyan 2 Gohan (Lv5)
 Gotenks evolves into Super Saiyan 3 Gotenks (Lv5, Lv6)
 Son Goten, Kami, Nail and Dende were removed from the Dragon Ball cast
 Eyeshield 21 17 characters (0 Battle, 11 Support, 6 Help)
 The Ha-Ha Brothers count as a single character
 Fist of the North Star*
 7 characters (2 Battle, 2 Support, 3 Help)
 Battle characters: Kenshiro and Raoh
 Gin Tama 13 characters (2 Battle, 6 Support, 5 Help)
 Battle characters: Gintoki Sakata and Kagura
 Hoshin Engi*
 4 characters (1 Battle, 1 Support, 2 Help)
 Battle character: Taikoubou
 Hunter × Hunter 7 characters (2 Battle, 3 Support, 2 Help)
 Battle characters: Gon Freecss and Killua Zoldyck
 I"s*
 4 characters (0 Battle, 2 Support, 2 Help)
 Strawberry 100% 7 characters (0 Battle, 4 Support, 3 Help)
 Jigoku Sensei Nūbē*
 4 characters (0 Battle, 2 Support, 2 Help)
 JoJo's Bizarre Adventure 10 characters (2 Battle, 6 Support, 2 Help)
 Battle characters: Jotaro Kujo (with Star Platinum) and Dio Brando (with the World)
 Jungle King Tar-chan*
 4 characters (0 Battle, 1 Support, 3 Help)
 Katekyo Hitman Reborn!''
 10 characters (1 Battle, 6 Support, 3 Help)
 Battle character: Tsuna Sawada (paired with Reborn)
 Kinnikuman*
 10 characters (1 Battle, 7 Support, 2 Help)
 Battle character: Kinnikuman
 Kochikame
 15 characters (1 Battle, 8 Support, 6 Help)
 Battle character: Kankichi Ryotsu
 Majin Tantei Nōgami Neuro*
 4 characters (1 Battle, 0 Support, 3 Help)
 Battle character: Neuro Nogami (paired with Yako Katsuragi)
 Midori no Makibaō*
 3 characters (0 Battle, 2 Support, 1 Help)
 Muhyo & Roji's Bureau of Supernatural Investigation*
 7 characters (1 Battle, 4 Support, 2 Help)
 Battle character: Toru Muhyo
 Naruto
 9 characters (4 Battle, 1 Support, 4 Help)
 Battle characters: Naruto Uzumaki, Sasuke Uchiha, Sakura Haruno and Kakashi Hatake
 Naruto Uzumaki evolves into Kyūbi Naruto (Lv7)
 Rock Lee, Neji Hyuuga, Hinata Hyuuga and Shikamaru Nara were removed from the Naruto cast
 Ninku*
 3 characters (1 Battle, 0 Support, 2 Help)
 Battle character: Fuusuke
 One Piece
 10 characters (6 Battle, 2 Support, 2 Help)
 Battle characters: Monkey D. Luffy, Roronoa Zoro, Nami, Sanji, Nico Robin and Franky
 Kiwi and Mozu count as a single character
 Monkey D. Luffy evolves into Luffy: Gear Second (Lv7, Lv8)
 Pyu to Fuku! Jaguar
 7 characters (1 Battle, 3 Support, 3 Help)
 Battle character: Jaguar Junichi
 Rokudenashi Blues*
 5 characters (0 Battle, 1 Support, 4 Help)
 Rurouni Kenshin
 7 characters (1 Battle, 4 Support, 2 Help)
 Battle character: Himura Kenshin
 Saint Seiya*
 7 characters (1 Battle, 4 Support, 2 Help)
 Battle character: Pegasus Seiya
 Pegasus Seiya evolves into Sagittarius Seiya (Lv8)
 Sakigake!! Otokojuku*
 10 characters (2 Battle, 4 Support, 4 Help)
 Battle characters: Momotaro Tsurugi and Heihachi Edajima
 Shaman King
 8 characters (2 Battle, 1 Support, 5 Help)
 Battle characters: Yoh Asakura and Anna Kyoyama
 Slam Dunk
 7 characters (0 Battle, 5 Support, 2 Help)
 Taizō Mote King Saga*
 3 characters (0 Battle, 2 Support, 1 Help)
 The Prince of Tennis
 9 characters (all Support)
 Shuichiro Oishi and Eiji Kikumaru count as a single character
 No characters of the series were added from Jump Super Stars
 Tottemo! Luckyman*
 3 characters (0 Battle, 2 Support, 1 Help)
 Yu-Gi-Oh!
 5 characters (1 Battle, 1 Support, 3 Help)
 Battle character: Yami Yugi
 YuYu Hakusho
 6 characters (3 Battle, 1 Support, 2 Help)
 Battle characters: Yusuke Urameshi, Kurama and Hiei

Reception
Metacritic gave it 89/100 based on 5 critic reviews.

References

External links 

 Jump Ultimate Stars official website 
 Ganbarion's official website 

2006 video games
Bleach (manga) video games
Crossover fighting games
Dragon Ball games
Fist of the North Star video games
Japan-exclusive video games
JoJo's Bizarre Adventure games
Multiplayer and single-player video games
Multiplayer online games
Naruto video games
Nintendo DS games
Nintendo DS-only games
Nintendo games
Nintendo Wi-Fi Connection games
One Piece games
Platform fighters
Saint Seiya video games
Video games based on anime and manga
Video games developed in Japan
Weekly Shōnen Jump (video game series)
Yu-Gi-Oh! video games
YuYu Hakusho games
Ganbarion games